Robert Potter (June 1800March 2, 1842) was an American politician and Texas independence activist. He was a U.S. Representative from North Carolina, and later a signer of the Texas Declaration of Independence and Texas Secretary of the Navy.

Early life
Potter was born in 1800 in Granville County, North Carolina near Williamsboro (now part of Vance County, North Carolina). His early education was in the common schools. He served as a midshipman in the United States Navy from 1815 to 1821.

Potter subsequently studied law, was admitted to the bar, and practiced in Halifax, North Carolina and Oxford, North Carolina.

Career
Potter was a member of the North Carolina House of Commons in 1826 and 1828. He was elected as a Jacksonian to the Twenty-first Congress and the Twenty-second Congress.  He served from March 4, 1829, until his resignation in November 1831, after he attacked and castrated two men, whom he believed to be having adulterous relationships with his wife.

He again served as a member of the state House of Commons from 1834 until his expulsion in January 1835 either for "cheating at cards" or "for brandishing a gun and knife during a fight over a card game".

Potter moved to Harrison County, Texas, in 1835 and settled on a farm overlooking Caddo Lake, near Marshall, Texas.  In Texas, he continued his political career, becoming a member of the Convention of 1836 which issued the Texas Declaration of Independence on March 2, 1836.  During the Texas Revolution Potter was Secretary of the Navy in the cabinet of interim President David G. Burnet.  He represented the Red River District in the Texas Congress in 1837–1841.

He participated in the Regulator-Moderator War in East Texas as a leader of the Harrison County Moderators.

Death and legacy
On March 2, 1842, Potter's home was surrounded by a band of Regulators led by William Pinckney Rose. He ran to the edge of Lake Soda (Caddo Lake) and dove in, his body sinking to the bottom after being shot. He was interred at "Potter’s Point," a bluff near his home; reinterred in the Texas State Cemetery, at Austin, Texas, in 1931. Potter County, Texas is named for him.

The historical novel Love is a Wild Assault, by Elithe Hamilton Kirkland is the story of his Texas wife or "paramour" as the central character.

See also
Twenty-first United States Congress
Twenty-second United States Congress
List of federal political scandals in the United States

References

Further reading
Fischer, Ernest G. Robert Potter: Founder of the Texas Navy. Gretna, La.: Pelican, 1976;
Shearer, Ernest Charles. Robert Potter, Remarkable North Carolinian and Texan. Houston: University of Houston Press, 1951.

External links 
U.S. Congressional Biography Directory entry
Political Graveyard
 
Robert & Harriet Potter

1800 births
1842 deaths
People from Vance County, North Carolina
Members of the North Carolina House of Representatives
People of the Texas Revolution
Signers of the Texas Declaration of Independence
Deaths by firearm in Texas
People murdered in Texas
Male murder victims
People expelled from United States state legislatures
Jacksonian members of the United States House of Representatives from North Carolina
United States Navy sailors
19th-century American politicians